Hermann Joseph Barrelet de Ricou (25 September 1879 – 24 April 1964) was a Swiss-born French rower. He won gold medals in single sculls at the 1900 Summer Olympics and 1901 European Championships. Barrelet continued to compete in single sculls into his thirties, but had better achievements in team events, winning European titles in the men's eight (1909) and double sculls (1913, with Anatol Peresselenzeff).

References

External links 

 

1879 births
1964 deaths
French male rowers
Olympic rowers of France
Rowers at the 1900 Summer Olympics
Olympic gold medalists for France
People from Neuchâtel
Olympic medalists in rowing
Medalists at the 1900 Summer Olympics
European Rowing Championships medalists
Place of death missing
Swiss emigrants to France